Cai Wenjing (also known as Elvira; born 13 January 1990)  is a Chinese actress.

Career
In 2014, Cai became known for her role in the youth romance drama Back in Time.

In 2015, Cai starred alongside Vincent Zhao in the war drama Hero Doesn't Shed Tears.

In 2016, Cai played the female lead in the wuxia drama Bu Liang Ren, based on the manhua of the same title.  She won the Most Popular Actress award at the Golden Guduo Media Awards. The same year she co-starred in the youth romance drama So Young, based on the novel of the same name by Xi Yiu.

In 2017, Cai starred in the medical romance suspense drama A Seven-Faced Man alongside Zhang Yishan. The same year she starred in the romance comedy web drama My Girlfriend's Boyfriend. She won the Most Promising Actress award at the Tencent Video Star Awards.

In 2018, Cai starred alongside Chen Kun in the Republican spy drama Lost in 1949, The same year she starred in the period mystery drama Mystery of Antiques based on the novel of the same name by Ma Boyong.

Cai was cast in the romance drama Love is Always Online alongside Xiong Ziqi. She was confirmed to star in the romance suspense drama The Controllers.

In 2020, Cai starred alongside Huang Xiaoming in the workplace romance drama Game Changer. The same year she starred in the historical fantasy drama Ling Long.

Filmography

Film

Television series

Discography

Albums

Singles

Awards and nominations

References 

1990 births
Living people
21st-century Chinese actresses
Chinese television actresses
Chinese film actresses
Beijing Film Academy alumni
Actresses from Hebei